Royal Tomb of King Suro Station is a station of the BGLRT Line of Busan Metro in Oe-dong, Gimhae, South Korea.

Station name
The station subname is formerly known as Gimhae Terminal, where the station was near at the Gimhae Bus Terminal. During the construction of the Gimhae Health Center where the station is nearby, the station subname was renamed into Gimhae Health Center.

Station Layout

Exits

External links
  Cyber station information from Busan Transportation Corporation

Busan Metro stations
Busan–Gimhae Light Rail Transit
Metro stations in Gimhae
Railway stations opened in 2011